Pallian Khurd is a village in Shaheed Bhagat Singh Nagar district of Punjab State, India. The village is administrated by Sarpanch an elected representative of the village.

Demography 
As of 2011, Pallian Khurd has a total number of 233 houses and population of 1153 of which 588 include are males while 565 are females according to the report published by Census India in 2011. The literacy rate of Pallian Khurd is 76.74% higher than the state average of 75.84%. The population of children under the age of 6 years is 117 which is 10.15% of total population of Pallian Khurd, and child sex ratio is approximately 800 as compared to Punjab state average of 846.

Most of the people are from Schedule Caste which constitutes 36.43% of total population in Pallian Khurd. The town does not have any Schedule Tribe population so far.

As per the report published by Census India in 2011, 570 people were engaged in work activities out of the total population of Pallian Khurd which includes 330 males and 240 females. According to census survey report 2011, 77.89% workers describe their work as main work and 22.11% workers are involved in Marginal activity providing livelihood for less than 6 months.

Education 
KC Engineering College and Doaba Khalsa Trust Group Of Institutions are the nearest colleges.

List of schools nearby:
Govt Primary School, Pallian Kalan
Govt Senior Secondary School, Ladhana Jhikka
Dashmesh Model School, Kahma
Govt High School, Jhander Kalan
Govt Gigh School, Khan Khana
Guru Ram Dass Public School, Cheta

Transport 

See also 
List of villages in India

References

External links 
 Tourism of Punjab
 Census of Punjab
 Locality Based PINCode

Villages in Shaheed Bhagat Singh Nagar district